Christian Larcher (born 15 September 1953, in Charmois-l'Orgueilleux, Lorraine, France) served as the International Commissioner of the Scouts et Guides de France for many years. He also assumed the interim post of Delegate General following the departure of Catherine Larrieu in 2016.

In 2015, Larcher was awarded the 345th Bronze Wolf, the only distinction of the World Organization of the Scout Movement, awarded by the World Scout Committee for exceptional services to world Scouting.

Larcher is married and lives in Lagny, Île-de-France, France.

References

External links

Recipients of the Bronze Wolf Award
1953 births
Scouting and Guiding in France
Living people